Romans 7 is the seventh chapter of the Epistle to the Romans in the New Testament of the Christian Bible. It is authored by Paul the Apostle, while he was in Corinth in the mid-50s AD, with the help of an amanuensis (secretary), Tertius, who adds his own greeting in Romans 16:22.

Text
The original text was written in Koine Greek. This chapter is divided into 25 verses.

Textual witnesses

Some early manuscripts containing the text of this chapter are:
Codex Vaticanus (AD 325–350)
Codex Sinaiticus (330–360)
Codex Alexandrinus (400–440)
Codex Ephraemi Rescriptus (~450; complete)

Old Testament references
 Romans 7:7 references Exodus 20:17 and Deuteronomy 5:21

Lifelong authority of the Law (7:1–4)
The concluding discussion in chapter 6 on slavery and freedom leads to the reintroduction of the topic of "the law and sin", that a believer has died not only to sin (6:3) but also to the law (verses 1–4).

Verse 1

"Has dominion" or "rules"; writing to "those who know the [Jewish] Law, Paul says that the Law has authority over a man (only) "as long as he lives" (verse 1).

Jewish Christians in Rome would have been familiar with the Hebrew Bible but many commentators recognise that "the whole Roman Church, whether Jewish or Gentile, would be familiar with it; many of them having been disciples of the synagogue, and all being directed constantly to the use of the Old Testament by apostolic precept and example". William Robertson Nicoll, however, argues that "neither Roman nor Mosaic law is specially referred to: the argument rests on the nature of law in general".

Marriage provides an example as stated in verse 2.

Verse 2

Verse 3

The one who dies is the "law", metaphorically "the husband", so from that time, the wife (the
believer) is no longer subject to his authority, that is "may not be judged a sinner" ('an adulterer') when remarrying. On the other hand, when the law has not died, one who disregards it (like a person who has an affair) may be judged as a sinner.

Verse 4

The conclusion "you [therefore] have died to the law through the body of Christ" aligns with the statement in verse 1 that "the law is binding on a person only during
a person's lifetime".

The law provides knowledge of sin (7:5–25)
A connection between 'law' and 'sin' was stated in the earlier parts of the epistle (Romans 3:20, 4:15, 5:13, and 5:20), but because this is regarded "surprising and controversial" for most readers, Paul elaborates more in chapter 6 and 7, especially in verses 5–12 where the law itself is said to be a cause of sin.

Verse 7
Paul asks a rhetorical question in verse 7:

Verse 8

Verse 9

 :Once I was alive without the law. But when this commandment came, sin came to life and I died}}

Verse 25

The second part of verse 25 may be paraphrased as "Thus, left to myself, I serve...", which may better capture Paul's meaning. It
should take account of Romans 8:1–7, as the person "with [the] flesh", "a slave to the law of
sin" in this verse will be the believer "not in the flesh" in chapter 8 (Romans 8:9) and is "set free from the law of sin" (Romans 8:2). Therefore, the final sentence of this verse seems to state the "best claim to be a description of believers" as it apparently comes with Paul's Christian thanksgiving (after verse 24). But since Paul did not know Christ's name at verse 24, then prior to and including verse 25 he was not speaking as a Christian, but as one still in bondage to sin, only exclaiming that, yes, there IS an answer, but then continuing with his explanation of death under the old covenant by stating that the MIND of natural man under law is subject to two laws, the one being the law of God but the other which dominates him as the law of sin.  Only in 8:2 is he depicted to be set free from the law of sin as a Christian. </ref><r/ef></ref></ref>

See also
 Ten Commandments
 Torah
 Related Bible parts: Exodus 20, Deuteronomy 5, Romans 6, Romans 8

Notes

References

Sources

External links
 King James Bible - Wikisource
English Translation with Parallel Latin Vulgate
Online Bible at GospelHall.org (ESV, KJV, Darby, American Standard Version, Bible in Basic English)
Multiple bible versions at Bible Gateway (NKJV, NIV, NRSV etc.)

07